The Far Ultraviolet Camera/Spectrograph (UVC) was one of the experiments deployed on the lunar surface by the Apollo 16 astronauts. It consisted of a telescope and camera that obtained astronomical images and spectra in the far ultraviolet region of the electromagnetic spectrum.

Instrument 
The Far Ultraviolet Camera/Spectrograph was a tripod mounted, f/1.0, 75 mm electronographic Schmidt camera weighing 22 kg.  It had a 20° field of view in the imaging mode, and 0.5x20° field in the spectrographic mode.  Spectroscopic data were provided from 300 to 1350 Ångström, with 30 Å resolution, and images were provided in two passbands ranges, 1050–1260 Å and 1200–1550 Å.  There were two corrector plates made of lithium fluoride (LiF) or calcium fluoride (CaF2), which could be selected for different bands of UV.  The camera contained a cesium iodide (CsI) photocathode and used a film cartridge which was recovered and returned to earth for processing.

The experiment was placed on the Descartes Highlands region of lunar surface where Apollo 16 astronauts John Young and Charles Duke landed in April 1972.  To keep it cool and eliminate solar glare, it was placed in the shadow of the lunar module.  It was manually aimed by the astronauts, who would re-point the telescope at targets throughout the lunar stay.

Experiment goals 
The goals of the Far Ultraviolet Camera/Spectrograph spanned across several disciplines of astronomy.  Earth studies were made by studying the Earth's upper atmosphere's composition and structure, the ionosphere, the geocorona, day and night airglow, and aurorae.  Heliophysics studies were made by obtaining spectra and images of the solar wind, the solar bow cloud, and other gas clouds in the solar system.  Astronomical studies by obtaining direct evidence of intergalactic hydrogen, and spectra of distant galaxy clusters and within the Milky Way.  Lunar studies were conducted by detecting gasses in the lunar atmosphere, and searching for possible volcanic gasses.  There were also considerations to evaluate the lunar surface as a site for future astronomical observatories.

Results 
The film cartridge was removed during the third and final extravehicular activity, and returned to earth. The rest of the instrument package was left on the lunar surface.  A total of 178 frames of film were obtained of 11  different targets including: the Earth's upper atmosphere and aurora, various nebulae and star clusters, and the Large Magellanic Cloud.

The film was digitally scanned and saved on tape. Files from these tapes can be requested at NASA. Most of the Apollo 16 and Skylab photos have been converted to JPGs by a third party enthusiast.

Designer 
The principal investigator and chief engineer of the Far Ultraviolet Camera/Spectrograph was Dr. George Robert Carruthers, who was working at the US Naval Research Lab. In 1969, Dr. Carruthers was given a patent for "Image Converter for Detecting Electromagnetic Radiation Especially in Short Wave Lengths".  For this and his further work, he received the 2012 National Medal of Technology and Innovation.

Second telescope 

A second spare telescope was slightly modified and later flown on Skylab 4.  It was given an aluminum (Al) and magnesium fluoride (MgF2) mirror rather than rhenium.  It was mounted on Skylab's Apollo Telescope Mount for usage in orbit. Among the many images and spectra that it took, it was used to study ultraviolet emission from Comet Kohoutek.

See also 
Apollo Program
Ultraviolet Astronomy

References

Further reading 
 
 
 

 
Apollo program
Ultraviolet telescopes
Space photography and videography